Nandor Sabo Paloc (February 19, 1960) is a former wrestler who competed in the 1988 Summer Olympics for Yugoslavia and in the 1992 Summer Olympics as an Independent Olympic participant.

References

1960 births
Living people
Serbian male sport wrestlers
Olympic wrestlers of Yugoslavia
Olympic wrestlers as Independent Olympic Participants
Wrestlers at the 1988 Summer Olympics
Wrestlers at the 1992 Summer Olympics
Yugoslav male sport wrestlers
World Wrestling Championships medalists
Mediterranean Games gold medalists for Yugoslavia
Mediterranean Games silver medalists for Yugoslavia
Competitors at the 1997 Mediterranean Games
Mediterranean Games medalists in wrestling